Seán McDermott Street is a street in northeast Dublin, Ireland. It is divided into Seán McDermott Street Lower (east end) and Seán McDermott Street Upper (west end).

Located in the north inner city, it runs west-east as an extension of Cathal Brugha Street, for about 530 metres ( mile) until it intersects with Buckingham Street.

History
The street was originally named Great Martin's Lane or Saint Martin's Lane, having that name by 1712. 

In 1764 it was renamed Gloucester Street for Prince William Henry, Duke of Gloucester and Edinburgh, brother of King George III. Many fine Georgian townhouses were built, but they were allowed to degrade into tenements by 1900 with most being demolished during the 20th century.

In the 1860s–1920s, Gloucester Street was the northern end of the notorious Monto red-light district, where thousands of prostitutes lived and worked.

Its intersection with Gloucester Place was known as the Gloucester Diamond, and was a centre for street football in the mid-20th century. The Gloucester Diamond is mentioned in Pete St. John's song "Johnny McGory", about a First World War veteran who returns to Dublin having lost a leg.

An IRA safe house was located at 36 Gloucester Street Lower during the Irish War of Independence; Conor Clune, Dick McKee and Sean Fitzpatrick were arrested there on 21 November 1920, the day before Bloody Sunday.

In 1933 the street was renamed for Seán Mac Diarmada (McDermott, 1883–1916), an executed leader of the Easter Rising. The area was plagued by juvenile crime, including by the so-called "animal gangs." In 1943–53, over 500 new homes were provided in the area by reconditioning. Nevertheless, the are continued to be plagued by poverty and crime, with Michael Keating criticising the squalor of the area in the late 1970s.

A Magdalene laundry for unwed mothers, including "repentant" prostitutes, opened in 1887 and did not close until 1996.

A temporary Catholic chapel was built in 1915; it was replaced by the Romanesque Revival Church of Our Lady of Lourdes in 1954. The church is known for its association with the ascetic Matt Talbot (1856–1925), whose remains were translated to the church in 1972. Pope John Paul II visited the street in 1978, but did not enter the shrine. A banner was erected reading "John Paul Rules OK".

Today, the Irish headquarters of the Society of Saint Vincent de Paul are located on Seán McDermott Street as well as a Simon Community hostel which is housed in the former carpenters' asylum, an impressive regency style former guildhall at number 35.

There is also a large public swimming pool, closed since 2019 for refurbishment.

Built heritage
Since the establishment of the street there have been numerous notable buildings, some of which have now been demolished while others are in a state of dereliction.

Scots Presbyterian Church
The Scots Presbyterian Church is a notable Greek-revival style church built on the street in 1846; it was later a Salvation Army building and a grain store and the façade of the building remains a landmark on the street as of 2021.

Gloucester Terrace
Gloucester Terrace was a Regency terrace of six houses constructed around 1831 with a unified pediment located at what was later referred to as 45 to 50 Lower Seán MacDermott Street but originally forming a portion of Gloucester Street. The houses were demolished in the 1950s to be replaced with an ESB substation and other public buildings.

Gallery

See also

List of streets and squares in Dublin

References

Streets in Dublin (city)
Historical red-light districts in the Republic of Ireland